Sara Rosina Gramática (born 26 May 1942) is an Argentine architect. For over 40 years, she was one of team of five architects who founded GGMPU Arquitectos, a firm based in Córdoba, Argentina. Today she is still active with her husband and son at MGM y Asociados.

Biography

Born on 26 May 1942 in Villa Dolores, Gramática studied architecture at the National University of Córdoba, graduating in 1965. Two years later, she began to collaborate with the architects Juan Carlos Guerrero, Jorge Morini, José Pisani and Eduardo Urtubey, all of whom she had met at university. In 1967, they five founded the architectural firm GGMPU (name based on their initials). They ran the firm together until 1971, when they founded COPSA. In 1995, COPSA's activities were again transferred back to GGMPU. Gramática and Morini are married and have had children together.

Faced with the financial crisis in Argentina, in 2002, together with Morini, Pisani and Urtubey, Gramática founded GMPU S.L. in Málaga, Spain. The firm designed residential buildings on the Mediterranean coast until 2011. From 2006, Gramática collaborated on a number of projects with her son, Lucio Morini. In 2013, GGMPU and GMPU S.L. ceased to exist, their activities being taken over by MCM y Asociados (Morini, Gramática, Morini) in which Gramática is still active.

Among GGMPU's completed projects in Argentina are Casa en el Lago in Villa Carlos Paz (1995) and a number of buildings in Córdoba including Nazareth III (1991), Palacio de Justicia II  (1998) and the extension to the Museo de Bellas Artes Emilio Caraffa (2008). In collaboration with Lucio Morini, the Centro Civico, Córdoba, was completed in 2012.

Awards
Among the many awards Gramática has received are:
1985: Premio Bienal Buenos Aires a la mejor arquitecta de Interés Social (Buenos Aires Biennial Award for the best female architect in social housing)
1992: Konex Visual Arts Award 
1998: Premio Bienal internacional de Arquitectura por su Palacio de Justicia de Córdoba
2000: Vitruvio a la Trayectoria, Buenos Aires

References

1942 births
Living people
Argentine architects
Argentine women architects
People from Córdoba, Argentina